Mae Wa National Park is a national park in Thailand's Lampang and Tak provinces. This mountainous park features scenic mountain viewpoints, waterfalls and caves.

Geography
The park's area is 364,173 rai ~ . The northern section of the park consists of high mountains while the central and southern sections consist of a high mountain plain.

Attractions
The park namesake Mae Wa waterfall is a 12-level waterfall originating from Doi Prae Luang mountain and whose waters eventually join the Wang River.

The park features numerous cave systems including Tham Phra Chedi, notable for hosting a pagoda-shaped stalagmite, and Tham Nampha Pha Ngam, a large cave also featuring stalagmites and stalactites.

Flora and fauna
The park features numerous forest types, including deciduous, deciduous dipterocarp, evergreen and coniferous forest. Tree species include Burmese ebony, Lagerstroemia calyculata, Dalbergia oliveri, Afzelia xylocarpa, Takian, Anisoptera costata, Shorea obtusa, Shorea siamensis, Dipterocarpus obtusifolius, Sumtran pine and Khasi pine.

Animals in the park include tiger, gaur, Asiatic black bear, sambar deer, barking deer, wild boar, Siamese hare and civet.

Bird life includes Asian barred owlet and coucal.

See also
List of national parks of Thailand
List of Protected Areas Regional Offices of Thailand

References

National parks of Thailand
Geography of Lampang province
Tourist attractions in Lampang province
Geography of Tak province
Tourist attractions in Tak province
2000 establishments in Thailand
Protected areas established in 2000